Laura Stéphanie Georges (born 20 August 1984) is a French retired footballer who is the Secretary General of the French Football Federation.  She last played for German club Bayern Munich of the Bundesliga, and served as the first-choice captain of her club and played primarily as a central defender, but was also used as a defensive midfielder. Georges was also a France women's international having made her senior international debut in September 2001. She represented her nation at seven major international tournaments; the 2003, 2011 and 2015 editions of the FIFA Women's World Cup and the 2005, 2009, 2013 and 2017 editions of the UEFA Women's Championship.

Club career

Early career
Georges began her football career playing for her hometown club Paris Saint-Germain at the age of 12. She spent six years in the club's youth academy before being accepted to CNFE Clairefontaine, the women's section of the Clairefontaine academy. Georges returned to Paris Saint-Germain after a year at Clairefontaine and was promoted to the senior team for the 2003–04 season. She made 19 appearances with the team scoring one goal.

After the league season with Paris Saint-Germain, Georges announced her intentions to move to the United States to attend Boston College. She majored in marketing and, while at the university, played college soccer for the Boston College Eagles women's soccer team. In her first season, Georges featured in 13 matches making nine starts. In her second season with the team, despite missing matches due to representing France internationally, she was named to the All-ACC first team and also earned third-team All-America honors from the NSCAA. In her final season at the university, Georges was named to the conference's first team for the second consecutive season and was awarded the ACC Defensive Player of the Year award. She was also a semifinalist for the prestigious Hermann Trophy.

Lyon
Following the conclusion of her amateur career, Georges returned to France to join Olympique Lyonnais. In her first season with the club, she was penciled in as a starter featuring in 18 matches as Lyon finished the season as champions after going undefeated. Georges was also influential in the team's Challenge de France campaign featuring in all four matches, including the final, which Lyon won, defeating her former club Paris Saint-Germain 3–0. In the 2008–09 season, Lyon were again crowned champions. In the season, Georges scored her first career goal for Lyon in the opening league match of the season against Paris Saint-Germain. She also helped the club reach the semi-finals in both the domestic cup and UEFA Women's Cup.

Following the departure of veterans Camille Abily and Sonia Bompastor to the WPS, Georges was handed the captaincy by coach Farid Benstiti for the 2009–10. She played in 16 league matches as Lyon were declared champions for the fourth consecutive season. In Europe, Georges was a part of the Lyon team that reached the 2010 UEFA Women's Champions League Final. The team, however, lost 7–6 on penalties to German club Turbine Potsdam. In the next season, despite the return of Abily and Bompastor, Georges remained captain and displayed her leadership by leading Lyon to victory in the UEFA Women's Champions League Final.

Paris Saint-Germain
In July 2013, she signed with PSG.

FC Bayern Munich
On 8 January she moved to FC Bayern Munich.

International career
Georges made her international debut for France on 26 September 2001 in a match against the Netherlands at the age of 17. She was a part of France's 2003 World Cup squad and also participated in the 2005 UEFA Women's Championship. As of total, she won 188 caps and scored six goals for the national team.

Career statistics

Club
Updated 8 June 2015

International

(Correct as of 22 December 2018)

International goals

Honours

Club
Lyon
Division 1 Féminine: Winner 2007–08, 2008–09, 2009–10, 2010–11, 2011–12, 2012–13
Coupe de France Féminine: Winner 2007–08, 2011–12, 2012–13
UEFA Women's Champions League: Winner 2010–11, 2011–12

International
France
Cyprus Cup: Winner 2012, 2014
SheBelieves Cup: Winner 2017

Individual
 ACC Defensive Player of the Year: 2006
 All-ACC First Team: 2005, 2006
 FIFA Women's World Cup All-Star Team: 2011

References

External links
 Club profile
 
 

1984 births
Living people
People from Le Chesnay
French women's footballers
French people of Guadeloupean descent
France women's international footballers
CNFE Clairefontaine players
Paris Saint-Germain Féminine players
Olympique Lyonnais Féminin players
2003 FIFA Women's World Cup players
2011 FIFA Women's World Cup players
2015 FIFA Women's World Cup players
FIFA Century Club
Carroll School of Management alumni
Footballers at the 2012 Summer Olympics
Olympic footballers of France
Women's association football defenders
Boston College Eagles women's soccer players
Division 1 Féminine players
FC Bayern Munich (women) players
Expatriate women's footballers in Germany
French expatriate sportspeople in Germany
Frauen-Bundesliga players
Black French sportspeople
Footballers from Yvelines
UEFA Women's Euro 2017 players
French expatriate women's footballers